Pentherichthys atratus is a species of dreamer known from the eastern Atlantic Ocean. The males, though much smaller, are non-parasitic. This species is the only known member of its genus.

Location
P. atratus can be found in the Eastern Atlantic, but larvae have been found in southwest of Madeira.

Size
The average length of an unsexed female of this species is about 11.9 centimeters.

Habitat
P. atratus is a bathypelagic predator.

References

Notes
 

Oneirodidae
Taxa named by Charles Tate Regan
Fish of the Atlantic Ocean
Taxa named by Ethelwynn Trewavas
Fish described in 1932